Choe Un-ju (born 23 January 1991,) is a female North Korean football midfielder.

As a junior, she was a member of the North Korea women's national under-20 football team. She won with the team the silver medal at the 2008 FIFA U-20 Women's World Cup and scored one goal during the tournament.
She was part of the North Korea women's national football team  at the 2012 Summer Olympics.
On club level she played for Pyongyang City.

International goals

Under-19

See also
 North Korea at the 2012 Summer Olympics

References

External links
 
 
 gettyimages.com

1991 births
Living people
North Korean women's footballers
Place of birth missing (living people)
Footballers at the 2012 Summer Olympics
Olympic footballers of North Korea
Women's association football midfielders
North Korea women's international footballers